AIESEC is an international youth-run and led, non-governmental and not-for-profit organization that provides young people with leadership development, cross-cultural internships, and global volunteer exchange experiences. The organization focuses on empowering young people to make a progressive social impact. The AIESEC network includes approximately 40,000 members in 120+ countries.

AIESEC is a non-governmental in consultative status with the United Nations Economic and Social Council (ECOSOC), is an independent arm of the UN DPI and UN's Office of the Secretary-General's Envoy on Youth, member of ICMYO, and is recognized by UNESCO. AIESEC's international headquarters are in Montreal, Canada.

Name
AIESEC was originally a French acronym for Association internationale des étudiants en sciences économiques et commerciales (English: International Association of Students in Economics and Business). The full name is no longer officially used, as members can now be graduate and undergraduate from any university background.

History

Founding 

The idea behind AIESEC started after World War II, when representatives from schools across Europe exchanged information about various programs and schools that specialized in business and economics. Students had been carrying out internships in other countries, mostly on their own initiative, but this came to a standstill with the onslaught of World War II. In 1944, the neutral Scandinavian countries were still exchanging students. Bertil Hedberg, an official at the Stockholm School of Economics, and students Jaroslav Zich (of Czechoslovakia) and Stanislas Callens (of Belgium), founded AIESEC on July 2, 1946, under the name Association Internationale des Etudiants en Sciences Economiques (AIESEc)  with a headquarter in Prague and Jaroslav Zich as the first President of the association.

At the time of AIESEC's founding at the end of the 1940s, Europe was in the midst of recovery from the war that dealt grave losses to its population. Factories and enterprises were in desperate need of executives, managers and leaders. The continent needed more than just business development, however; the war had severely damaged relations between European nations, and many members of the community felt steps needed to be taken to address this problem. AIESEC was formed to address both of these concerns. In 1948, a renewing development of the association was initiated, with implementation of international meetings (congresses), replacing the practice of governance from the headquarter. The first broad meeting was held by students from 9 universities of 7 countries in April 1948 in Liège (Belgium). Then the official, constitutive assembly (the congress) was organized in 1949 in Stockholm with Bengt Sjӧstrand as the President and Sweden as the Presiding Country for 1949/1950. Students from seven nations: Belgium, Denmark, Finland, France, Netherlands, Norway and Sweden, came together for that first International Congress of AIESEC.

In 1949, 89 students were exchanged by AIESEC among the member nations. The next two annual congresses were conducted in Stockholm, presided by Bengt Sjӧstrand, and in Paris, presided by Jean Choplin, respectively. At those congresses the organization's mission was stated: "to expand the understanding of a nation by expanding the understanding of the individuals, changing the world one person at a time." Also a constitution for the organization defined a purpose: "AIESEC is an independent, non-political, and international organization which has as its purpose to establish and promote the friendly relations between the members."

Global expansion 

The organization grew exponentially in the following years, with more than 1,000 exchanges taking place in 1955 alone. In the following few years, AIESEC quickly became global by establishing its first North American member, the United States, in 1957, and its first South American and African members, Colombia, Venezuela, and South Africa, in 1958.

For the first years of its existence, AIESEC had no central governing body, but was instead managed jointly by a Presiding Country Committee composed of the National Committee Presidents of each member nation. As the organization grew, a central governing body was created and led by a democratically elected Secretary General. Morris Wolff, from the United States, was chosen as the first Secretary General in 1960, and established the first permanent international office for AIESEC in Geneva, Switzerland. Over the following decade, AIESEC expanded to eastern Asia, Australia, and deeper within Europe, Africa, North America, and South America, having a presence in 43 countries by 1969.

In 2010, AIESEC surpassed 10,000 exchanges delivered in a single year for the first time. By 2020, more than 230,000 interactions will have been provided.

Campus involvement
AIESEC provides a platform for young people in different universities and colleges, by going on an international internship and/or by joining various local chapters. These young individuals can develop their leadership potential by working and leading international teams.  Associate membership opportunities allow young people to work with various NGO partners of AIESEC, and represent their country as a part of campus ambassador programs. The organization's products are Global Talent, Global Teacher and Global Volunteer.

Each year members have an opportunity to live and work in a foreign country. Participants can choose to work in the areas of management, technology, education, or development. This helps them build their corporate skills.

Conferences 

AIESEC hosts over 500 conferences every year that range in length and demographic scope. The purpose of conferences are to bring the international community of AIESEC members together to enhance their professional skills, provide networking opportunities, and work on organizational strategy. Topics of interest the organization focuses on include: leadership, sustainable development, entrepreneurship, innovation, corporate social responsibility, and youth impact on modern society.

Global Volunteer 
"AIESEC is a global network of people that simply believe that youth leadership is not an option, but our responsibility." The "Global Volunteer" portfolio in AIESEC is an international volunteer program which allows youth aged 18–29 to contribute to the United Nations' sustainable development goals of 2030. The Global Volunteering programs are short-term in nature (6–8 weeks) and provide youth with opportunities to travel abroad and work for Non-profit organizations with a special focus of second and third world countries.  Projects include teaching, promoting HIV/AIDS awareness, working in human rights, environmental sustainability, leadership development and more. Since AIESEC is a non-profit organization, the exchange participants are to bear all expenses associated with travel including airfare, medical insurance, and transportation. Some of AIESEC's projects will provide food and accommodation. AIESEC's partnership with the United Nations seeks to tap the undiscovered potential of the youth globally and allow them to create a long-lasting impact to boost the international community.

Global Entrepreneur 
The Global Entrepreneur program provides graduates and undergraduates with the opportunity to gain a professional working experience in a start-up abroad. This program is not included in the roadmap of A2025.

Global Talent 
"Global Talent" is a global internship opportunity at a startup, SME or an MNC for young people who seek to develop themselves and their career. They range from 6 weeks to 1.5 years in nature. Global youth unemployment has become one of the top challenges faced by the youth today. AIESEC contributes to this issue through its Global Talent program, where a young person works abroad with entrepreneurs in a startup, accelerator or incubator, SMEs and companies to advance their goals and grow; thus developing an entrepreneurial stint through a global opportunity allowing yourself to expand your network and develop on a personal and professional level.

YouthSpeak 
YouthSpeak Initiative is a youth movement powered by AIESEC. AIESEC believes that the society needs the young people of the world to take action on the UN goals for 2030, and AIESEC serves as a platform for youth empowerment. 
 YouthSpeak Survey aims to collect the common voice of the global youth and educate them about the Global Goals for Sustainable Development. There are 1.8 billion young people in the world and their voice needs to be heard.
 YouthSpeak Forum gathers the youth as future leaders and current ones into same action space.

Awards and recognition 
In July 2015 AIESEC was recognized for the 9th time on the WorldBlu list of "Most Freedom Centred Workplaces." An organization makes it onto the WorldBlu List through a rigorous Freedom at Work assessment process completed by employees. The assessment evaluates the overall design of an organization along a fear-based to freedom-centred continuum in three core areas: leadership, individual performance and systems and processes.

Members
As of 2018, AIESEC is found in 126 countries and territories worldwide, including:

Alumni
AIESEC's alumni include a wide range of individuals, professionals, entrepreneurs, business people, politicians and one Nobel Prize winner. This is a non-exhaustive list of notable AIESEC alumni:
 Aleksander Kwaśniewski, President of Poland from 1995 to 2005.
 Martti Ahtisaari, the tenth President of Finland (1994–2000), Nobel Peace Prize laureate and United Nations diplomat and mediator
 Mario Monti, former Prime Minister of Italy
 Aníbal Cavaco Silva, former Prime Minister and President of Portugal
 César Gaviria, Colombian economist and politician who served as the President of Colombia from 1990 to 1994, Secretary General of the Organization of American States from 1994 to 2004
 Gunter Pauli
 Junichiro Koizumi, former Prime Minister of Japan
 Helmut Kohl, former German Chancellor
 Janez Drnovšk, former Prime Minister of Slovenia
 James Shaw, Minister of Statistics and Climate Change Issues of New Zealand
 Nerses Yeritsyan, Deputy Chairman of the Central Bank of Armenia, former Minister of Economy of Armenia
 Andrei Spînu, Deputy Prime Minister and Minister of Infrastructure and Regional Development of the Republic of Moldova

See also
 United Nations
 IAESTE
 AIESEC

References

External links

Organizations established in 1946
International student organizations
Student exchange
International organizations based in France
Organizations based in Montreal
International nongovernmental youth organizations
Alumni associations